Chümoukedima, formerly spelled Chumukedima, is a municipality in the Chümoukedima District of the Indian state of Nagaland. It is situated on the left bank of the Chathe and with its surrounding area that includes several other towns and villages, the Chümoukedima Metropolitan Area is the largest urban agglomeration in Nagaland in terms of area and third largest in terms of population, after Dimapur and Kohima.

Chümoukedima is the only municipality of the district of the same name. Chümoukedima was designated as the first headquarters of then Naga Hills District of Assam Province, British India from 1866 until the administrative office  moved to Wokha in 1875 and then to Kohima in 1879.

History
During the British era from 1866 to 1875, Chümoukedima served as the first headquarters of the then Naga Hills District of Assam Province.

On 2 December 1997, the Government of Nagaland declared the erstwhile-Dimapur Sub-Division of Kohima District as a full-fledged District with Chümoukedima as its district headquarter. Construction of a new Deputy Commissioner's Office Complex at Chümoukedima soon began with the old Additional Deputy Commissioner's Office Complex at Dimapur continuing to temporarily serve the new district but over the years there were stiff oppositions from various Dimapur-based Civil Society Organizations to shift the district headquarters to Chümoukedima. On 18 December 2021, the Government of Nagaland in response split the Dimapur District into three separate districts—Chümoukedima, the existing Dimapur and Niuland.

Geography
It is located in the foothills of Naga Hills. The Tourist Village on the top of a hill projects a bird's eye view of the whole of Chümoukedima District, Dimapur District and other parts of Karbi Anglong District of Assam. Waterfalls are also located in this area.

Wards
The city has 11 administrative wards:

Demographics
 India census, Chümoukedima had a population of 43,516.

Economy
Chümoukedima is one of the fastest-growing urban centres in Nagaland. In fact, it forms part of the Chümoukedima–Dimapur urban area, which is the largest and the fastest-growing urban hub of Nagaland. The town's population has grown by nearly five times in the last two decades.

Culture

Parks
Appu Park is a park located inside Chümoukedima Police Complex. The Nagaland Zoological Park, Green Park, Aqua Mellow Park, Agri Expo site Niathu Resort and Noune Resort are all located in the Chümoukedima Metropolitan Area.

Media
Chümoukedima is home to Nagaland's first satellite television network: Hornbill TV.

Transportation

Air

Road

Highways passing through Chümoukedima
  Asian Highway 1 : Tokyo  – Chümoukedima  – Istanbul
  Asian Highway 2 : Denpasar – Chümoukedima  - Khosravi
  : Dabaka (Assam) – Chümoukedima – Jessami (Manipur)

Rail

Education

Universities and Colleges
 ICFAI University
 St. Joseph University
 Mount Mary College
 National Institute of Technology
 Patkai Christian College
 Tetso College

Schools
 North Town Higher Secondary School
 St. Joseph Higher Secondary School
 Charis High Academy
 Godwin Higher Secondary School
 Mount Mary Higher Secondary School

Notable residents
 S. C. Jamir, Politician
 Salhoutuonuo Kruse, Politician
 Neiphiu Rio, Politician
 Zhaleo Rio, Politician
 Chekrovolü Swüro, Sportsperson

See also

 Dimapur

References

External links

Official sites
Official website

 
Cities and towns in Chümoukedima district
Chümoukedima district